WTXR is a radio station on 89.7 FM in Toccoa Falls, Georgia, United States. The station is owned by Radio Training Network of Greenville, South Carolina, and is part of its His Radio Praise network carrying a contemporary worship music format. Prior to being owned by RTN, WTXR was the student-run campus radio station of Toccoa Falls College.

History
Toccoa Falls College filed for a construction permit for a new FM radio station on July 13, 1995; the Federal Communications Commission approved the application on April 9, 1996. WTXR was licensed, initially as WDPA, on September 16, 1997, before changing call letters in November. The radio station played predominantly Christian rock and Contemporary Christian music but also featured various specialty shows. It was a companion to sister WRAF, which was also run by the college.

As time went on, students moved the station in a Christian rock direction as "The Eagle", helping give it a distinct identity from WRAF.
WTXR, along with sister stations WEPC, WPFJ, WRAF, and translators W221AZ and W265AZ, were purchased by Radio Training Network, Inc. effective July 25, 2016 for $2.1 million.

References

External links
 

TXR
Contemporary Christian radio stations in the United States
Radio stations established in 1997
1997 establishments in Georgia (U.S. state)
TXR